Romario Shepherd (born 26 November 1994) is a Guyanese cricketer who plays for Guyana in domestic cricket and for West Indies in international cricket. He made his international debut for West Indies in November 2019.

Domestic and franchise career
A right-arm fast bowler, Shepherd made his List A debut for Guyana in January 2016, playing against the Leeward Islands in the 2015–16 Regional Super50. Opening the bowling with Steven Jacobs, he took 3/37 from 10 overs on debut, including the first two wickets to fall, and was named man of the match. He made his first-class debut for Guyana in the 2016–17 Regional Four Day Competition on 10 March 2017. He made his Twenty20 debut for Guyana Amazon Warriors in the tournament on 5 September 2018.

In July 2020, Shepherd was named in the Guyana Amazon Warriors squad for the 2020 Caribbean Premier League. In December 2021, he was signed by the Karachi Kings following the players' draft for the 2022 Pakistan Super League. In February 2022, he was bought by the Sunrisers Hyderabad in the auction for the 2022 Indian Premier League tournament.

International career
In October 2019, Shepherd was named in the West Indies One Day International (ODI) squad for their series against Afghanistan. He made his ODI debut for the West Indies, against Afghanistan, on 6 November 2019. In January 2020, he was named in the West Indies Twenty20 International (T20I) squad for their series against Ireland. He made his T20I debut for the West Indies, against Ireland, on 18 January 2020.

References

External links
 

1994 births
Living people
West Indies One Day International cricketers
West Indies Twenty20 International cricketers
Sportspeople from Georgetown, Guyana
Guyana cricketers
Guyanese cricketers
Guyana Amazon Warriors cricketers